Island Trio  (Hangul: 섬총사; RR: Sumchongsa) is a South Korean travel-reality show broadcast on O'live and cable TV, tvN. A comedian, an actress and a singer combined into a trio visiting different islands and stay with local islanders to experience the lifestyle as islanders. This show premiered on May 22, 2017, at 9.30pm KST and airs every Monday, which later on changed the time-slot to 10:50pm KST.

In Season 2 of the show, with Kang Ho-dong to remain while Lee Soo-geun and Lee Yeon-hee join the cast lineup, replacing Kim Hee-sun and Jung Yong-hwa. It premiered on 25 June 2018 at 11pm KST.

Airtime

Cast
 Kang Ho-dong (Season 1-2)
 Lee Soo-geun (Season 2)
 Lee Yeon-hee (Season 2)

Former
 Kim Hee-sun (Season 1)
 Jung Yong-hwa (Season 1)

Episode

Season 1 (2017)

Season 2 (2018)

Ratings
This show is aired on both Olive TV and tvN, however, the ratings shown above are only based on tvN's rating and not inclusive Olive TV's broadcast.
TNmS have stopped publishing their rating report from June 2018.

Season 1

Season 2

Notes

References

External links
  (Season 1) 
  (Season 2) 

2017 South Korean television series debuts
TVN (South Korean TV channel) original programming
South Korean reality television series
Television shows set on islands
Korean-language television shows
Television series by SM C&C